Skibotn Chapel is a chapel of the Church of Norway in Storfjord Municipality in Troms og Finnmark county, Norway. It is located in the village of Skibotn. It is an annex chapel for the Storfjord parish which is part of the Nord-Troms prosti (deanery) in the Diocese of Nord-Hålogaland. The white, wooden, cruciform chapel was originally built and designed by a local builder in 1895. The building has been remodeled and enlarged several times since. The building was consecrated as a chapel on 22 Jun 1931 by the Bishop Eivind Berggrav. The chapel seats about 710 people (more than the population of the village), and it is used for large Læstadian gatherings for the region.

See also
List of churches in Nord-Hålogaland

References

Storfjord
Churches in Troms
Wooden churches in Norway
Cruciform churches in Norway
19th-century Church of Norway church buildings
Churches completed in 1895
1895 establishments in Norway